Moscow City Duma District 37 is one of 45 constituencies in Moscow City Duma. The constituency covers parts of South-Western Moscow, as well as parts of Prospekt Vernadskogo. District 37 was created in 2013, after Moscow City Duma had been expanded from 35 to 45 seats.

Members elected

Election results

2014

|-
! colspan=2 style="background-color:#E9E9E9;text-align:left;vertical-align:top;" |Candidate
! style="background-color:#E9E9E9;text-align:left;vertical-align:top;" |Party
! style="background-color:#E9E9E9;text-align:right;" |Votes
! style="background-color:#E9E9E9;text-align:right;" |%
|-
|style="background-color:"|
|align=left|Nikolay Gubenko
|align=left|Communist Party
|
|31.73%
|-
|style="background-color:"|
|align=left|Yelena Rusakova
|align=left|Yabloko
|
|25.63%
|-
|style="background-color:"|
|align=left|Mikhail Vyshegorodtsev
|align=left|Civic Platform
|
|12.68%
|-
|style="background-color:"|
|align=left|Aleksey Silnov
|align=left|Independent
|
|12.59%
|-
|style="background-color:"|
|align=left|Yulia Rubleva
|align=left|A Just Russia
|
|8.80%
|-
|style="background-color:"|
|align=left|Gennady Mishin
|align=left|Liberal Democratic Party
|
|3.43%
|-
|style="background-color:"|
|align=left|Sirazhdin Ramazanov
|align=left|Social Democratic Party
|
|1.24%
|-
| colspan="5" style="background-color:#E9E9E9;"|
|- style="font-weight:bold"
| colspan="3" style="text-align:left;" | Total
| 
| 100%
|-
| colspan="5" style="background-color:#E9E9E9;"|
|- style="font-weight:bold"
| colspan="4" |Source:
|
|}

2019

|-
! colspan=2 style="background-color:#E9E9E9;text-align:left;vertical-align:top;" |Candidate
! style="background-color:#E9E9E9;text-align:left;vertical-align:top;" |Party
! style="background-color:#E9E9E9;text-align:right;" |Votes
! style="background-color:#E9E9E9;text-align:right;" |%
|-
|style="background-color:"|
|align=left|Nikolay Gubenko (incumbent)
|align=left|Communist Party
|
|58.29%
|-
|style="background-color:"|
|align=left|Yury Maksimov
|align=left|Liberal Democratic Party
|
|19.08%
|-
|style="background-color:"|
|align=left|Aleksandr Romanovich
|align=left|A Just Russia
|
|17.18%
|-
| colspan="5" style="background-color:#E9E9E9;"|
|- style="font-weight:bold"
| colspan="3" style="text-align:left;" | Total
| 
| 100%
|-
| colspan="5" style="background-color:#E9E9E9;"|
|- style="font-weight:bold"
| colspan="4" |Source:
|
|}

2021

|-
! colspan=2 style="background-color:#E9E9E9;text-align:left;vertical-align:top;" |Candidate
! style="background-color:#E9E9E9;text-align:left;vertical-align:top;" |Party
! style="background-color:#E9E9E9;text-align:right;" |Votes
! style="background-color:#E9E9E9;text-align:right;" |%
|-
|style="background-color:"|
|align=left|Vladimir Ryzhkov
|align=left|Yabloko
|16,623
|21.05%
|-
|style="background-color:"|
|align=left|Darya Bagina
|align=left|Communist Party
|15,658
|19.83%
|-
|style="background-color:"|
|align=left|Yekaterina Razzakova
|align=left|United Russia
|12,822
|16.24%
|-
|style="background-color:"|
|align=left|Maksim Chirkov
|align=left|A Just Russia — For Truth
|9,274
|11.75%
|-
|style="background-color:"|
|align=left|Yury Maksimov
|align=left|Liberal Democratic Party
|5,553
|7.03%
|-
|style="background-color:"|
|align=left|Yury Dmitriyev
|align=left|New People
|5,200
|6.59%
|-
|style="background-color:"|
|align=left|Roman Khudyakov
|align=left|Independent
|4,580
|5.80%
|-
|style="background-color:"|
|align=left|Aleksandr Bely
|align=left|Independent
|4,561
|5.78%
|-
|style="background:;"| 
|align=left|Leonid Afanasyev
|align=left|Communists of Russia
|2,849
|3.61%
|-
| colspan="5" style="background-color:#E9E9E9;"|
|- style="font-weight:bold"
| colspan="3" style="text-align:left;" | Total
| 78,958
| 100%
|-
| colspan="5" style="background-color:#E9E9E9;"|
|- style="font-weight:bold"
| colspan="4" |Source:
|
|}

Notes

References

Moscow City Duma districts